Michael Burns (born 6 July 1979) is a New Zealand cricketer. He played in thirteen first-class and nine List A matches for Wellington from 2006 to 2010.

See also
 List of Wellington representative cricketers

References

External links
 

1979 births
Living people
New Zealand cricketers
Wellington cricketers